Monmouth is a historic antebellum home located at 1358 John A. Quitman Boulevard in Natchez, Mississippi on a  lot. It was built in 1818 by John Hankinson, and renovated about 1853 by John A. Quitman, a former Governor of Mississippi and well-known figure in the Mexican–American War. It is one of Natchez's grandest Greek Revival mansions. It was declared a Mississippi Landmark in 1986 and a National Historic Landmark in 1988.  It is now a small luxury hotel.

History

John and Francing Hankinson
The home was built by John Hankinson, a postmaster, lawyer and steamboat entrepreneur, during the depression that followed the War of 1812, and named after his home, Monmouth County, New Jersey. The mansion was a brick two-story in the Federal style, with a wide central hall with four rooms located off the hall on both floors. There was also a detached brick kitchen behind it, a garden house, and several outhouses. Hankinson and his wife died soon after completing the house and the house was sold at a public auction to Calvin Smith, who one year later sold the property to John Anthony Quitman, the future Governor of Mississippi.

John and Eliza Quitman
John Quitman, originally of New York City, was a partner in a successful Natchez law firm and married Eliza Turner, a member of one of the most prominent families in the city, being the niece of Edward Turner, a Mississippi Supreme Court judge. Quitman purchased Monmouth in 1826 for his wife and growing family. The house was extensively renovated by the Quitmans in 1853 in the fashionable Greek Revival style. The original brick was covered by stucco, scored to look like stone, and the portico was added to the front, along with the four square columns supporting it. Quitman also added the rear gallery and southeast wing of the house, along with a second story for the detached kitchen.

After Quitman died at Monmouth on July 17, 1858, and his wife died a year later, their five daughters and one son inherited the plantation. In 1862, when Natchez was attacked by the Union army during the American Civil War, most of the slaves fled. Most of Quitman's original possessions were either stolen in 1863, when the house was occupied by Union soldiers, or sold by Quitman's daughters in 1865 due to financial difficulty. The house was spared from further damage during the war, as the daughters befriended a Union general and pledged loyalty to the United States. In 1866, three of the daughters, Louisa, Annie Rosalie and Fredericka, purchased their siblings' share of the property, and by 1890, Annie Rosalie was the sole owner of Monmouth. In 1914, when she died, the house was left to her nieces, who later sold it in 1924. For the next half century, the house was severely neglected with the house and other surviving structures filled with litter and the grounds overgrown.

Ronald and Lani Riches
After several changes of ownership, Ronald and Lani Riches of Los Angeles, California, purchased the property in 1978 and restored it to its original condition. The restoration of the house and original brick kitchen took three years. In 1982, after archaeological research determined the location of two small houses used as slave quarters, the buildings were reconstructed on the original sites. Though most of John Quitman's original furnishings had been lost, the house still contained a few pieces such as a sofa, a carved settee, and several chairs. The Riches searched for other furniture and memorabilia from Quitman, and they were able to recover his desk, two four-poster beds, and the Quitman family Bible. Other memorabilia now include the gold sword presented to Quitman by James K. Polk and the United States Congress for his services in the Mexican–American War, as well as the red handkerchief Quitman used to rally his troops.

Nancy and Warren Reuthter
Nancy and Warren Reuther are some of the current managing owners of Monmouth Historic Inn along with private investors. With extensive experience in the hotel and tourism industry, they continue to make sure every modern comfort has been provided in the 30 elegantly appointed spacious rooms and suites, yet carefully integrated as not to spoil the historic architectural virtue.

Monmouth Historic Inn & Gardens
Monmouth is now a small luxury hotel with 30 rooms and suites throughout the house and grounds. There is a fine-dining restaurant on site, Restaurant 1818, as well as a casual dining in The Quitman Lounge. Tours of the mansion are offered daily at 10 am and 2pm, and a gift shop in open to the public 7 days a week from 8am until 9pm. There have been a number of notable guests including President and Hillary Clinton, Michael Eisner, Alec Baldwin, Maya Angelou, Sela Ward, James Woods, Rob Reiner, Connie Chung, Morley Safer, Debbie Gibson, Ruby Dee and Michael Damian.

References

External links
 Monmouth Historic Inn Official Site

Antebellum architecture
Greek Revival houses in Mississippi
National Historic Landmarks in Mississippi
Houses completed in 1818
Historic house museums in Mississippi
Museums in Natchez, Mississippi
Mississippi Landmarks
Hotel buildings on the National Register of Historic Places in Mississippi
Houses in Natchez, Mississippi
National Register of Historic Places in Natchez, Mississippi
Slave cabins and quarters in the United States